A stripping reaction may refer to:
Stripping reaction (physics)
Stripping reaction (chemistry)